The Headless Horseman is a fictional character that appears in many venues.

Headless Horseman may also refer to:

 Headless Horseman ("Legend of Sleepy Hollow"), a character in the 1820 short story "The Legend of Sleepy Hollow" by Washington Irving

Film
 The Headless Horseman (1922 film), a horror film starring Will Rogers
 "The Headless Horseman" (1934 film), a film directed by Ub Iwerks and part of the ComiColor cartoon series
 The Headless Horseman (1972 film), a 1972 Soviet Western by Vladimir Vajnshtok
 Headless Horseman (film), a 2007 film that aired on the Sci Fi Channel
 The Headless Horseman, a character in the 1949 animated film The Adventures of Ichabod and Mr. Toad
 The Headless Horseman, a character in the 1999 horror film Sleepy Hollow
 Headless Horseman, a 2022 The Asylum film.

Music
The Headless Horseman, a 2002 album by Pegazus
"The Headless Horseman", a 1949 song from The Adventures of Ichabod and Mr. Toad
"The Headless Horseman", a 1986 song by Joe Satriani from Not of This Earth
"Headless Horseman", a 2003 song by Pigmy Love Circus from The Power of Beef
"Headless Horseman", a 2001 song by the Microphones from The Glow Pt. 2

Other uses
The Headless Horseman (novel), an 1865 novel by Mayne Reid
Headless Horseman Hayrides, a Halloween attraction in Ulster Park, New York
The Horseless Headless Horsemann, a character in Team Fortress 2

See also

 
 Horseman (disambiguation)